Jacob "Jaap" Blokker (5 February 1942 – 5 July 2011) was a Dutch businessman and executive.

Blokker was born in Amsterdam.  From 1976 to 2010 he was general director of Blokker Holding, which operates a series of chain stores in various countries; the best-known in the Netherlands is Blokker. He was also an outspoken critic of the euro and the effects of immigration, and published his criticism in the Blokker Holding annual reports.

Death
Blokker died in Laren aged 69, after a long fight against cancer.

References

External links 
  In Memoriam Jaap Blokker

1942 births
2011 deaths
Deaths from cancer in the Netherlands
Dutch chief executives in the retail industry
Knights of the Order of the Netherlands Lion
Businesspeople from Amsterdam